Atsuko Tanaka may refer to:

Atsuko Tanaka (animator) (active from 1989), Japanese animator
Atsuko Tanaka (artist) (1932–2005), Japanese avant-garde artist
Atsuko Tanaka (ski jumper) (born 1992), Canadian Olympic ski jumper
Atsuko Tanaka (voice actress) (born 1962), Japanese voice actress